The 1967 Brown Bears football team was an American football team that represented Brown University during the 1967 NCAA University Division football season. Brown finished second-to-last in the Ivy League. 

In their first season under head coach Len Jardine, the Bears compiled a 2–6–1 record and were outscored 206 to 77. Tom Whidden and J. Batty were the team captains. 

The Bears' 1–5–1 conference record placed seventh in the Ivy League standings. They were outscored by Ivy opponents 194 to 61. 

Brown played its home games at Brown Stadium in Providence, Rhode Island.

Schedule

References

Brown
Brown Bears football seasons
Brown Bears football